Michael Troutman Simmons (August 5, 1814 – November 15, 1867) was an American pioneer and one of the first white men to settle in the Puget Sound.

Biography
Simmons was one of ten children, born in Kentucky in 1814. As a boy, he moved with his mother to Pike County, Illinois. When Michael was 21 years old, he moved to Iowa and married a 15-year-old girl named Elizabeth Kindred. Five years later, the couple moved to Missouri and Michael built a gristmill. At the age of 30, he decided to abandon the Mid-West and came to the Puget Sound on a wagon train with a group of settlers (including his friend George Washington Bush) in late 1845. He assumed leadership of the new settlers, who gave him the title of "Colonel". After taking advice from the traders of the Hudson's Bay Company at Fort Nisqually, the new American settlers founded New Market (later Tumwater). Despite its help, three years later Simmons led a campaign of complaints against the "monarchist" Hudson's Bay Company.

At New Market, Simmons exploited the power of Tumwater Falls to construct mills, but in 1850 sold his interests at New Market and moved to Olympia. Simmons invested in shipping and, despite being illiterate, became Olympia's postmaster. After the appointment of Isaac Stevens as the first governor of newly established Washington Territory, Simmons was appointed Indian agent and in 1854 and 1855 was charged with preparing the enforcement of Governor Steven's Indian treaties. Simmons died on November 15, 1867.

References

Sources
 Ficken, Robert E. (2002). Washington Territory. Pullman.
 Morgan, Murray (1979). Puget's Sound: A Narrative of Early Tacoma and the Southern Sound. Seattle.
 Wilma, David (January 22, 2003). "Michael T. Simmons settles at Tumwater in October 1845". Retrieved January 11, 2007.

External links
 Washington State History Museum, Treaties and Councils: The Stevens Entourage

1814 births
1867 deaths
Washington (state) pioneers
History of Washington (state)
Oregon Trail
People from Kentucky
People from Tumwater, Washington
United States Indian agents